The Hadhayosh is a land creature from ancient Persian mythology. In the Avesta it is also called the Sarsaok.  In the 14th century, it was said to have raided Iran, giving itself a name as a fearsome beast.

Description in the Avesta
The Avesta is one of the very few texts which reference the creature, describing it as a primeval ox:
Of the ox Hadhayosh, which they call Sarsaok, it says, that in the original creation men passed from region to region upon it, and in the renovation of the universe they prepare Hush (the beverage producing immortality) from it.

See also 
 Avesta
 Zoroastrianism

References

External links
1. The Avesta - Zoroastrian Archives: An in-depth guide to the religion and its texts: http://www.avesta.org/avesta.html

Persian legendary creatures